Westerhoven is a village in the Dutch province of North Brabant. It is located in the municipality of Bergeijk, about 15 km southwest of Eindhoven.

History
Westerhoven lies in a valley between the rivers Keersop and Beekloop which flow just outside the centre of the village.

The hill connecting the neighbor village Riethoven dates from Roman times. Frankish ceramics have been found there.

Westerhoven used to be part of the ‘heerlijkheid’ Bergeyk but became independent in 1810.
Westerhoven was a separate municipality until 1997, when it became part of Bergeijk by municipality reclassification.

A Second World War cemetery containing 220 British soldiers was created near Westerhoven in October 1944. It is now maintained by the Commonwealth War Graves Commission.

The spoken language is Kempenlands (an East Brabantian dialect, which is very similar to colloquial Dutch).

References

Municipalities of the Netherlands disestablished in 1997
Populated places in North Brabant
Former municipalities of North Brabant
Bergeijk